William Jenkins (born 25 July 1904) was a unionist politician in Northern Ireland.

Jenkins studied at the Belfast College of Technology then worked in Bombay from 1931 to 1956 as the director of a tea company.  He then returned to Northern Ireland, where he held numerous directorships, but also found time to sit on the Belfast Corporation as an Ulster Unionist Party member.  He served as Lord Mayor of Belfast from 1963 to 1966.

References

1904 births
Year of death missing
High Sheriffs of Belfast
Members of the Senate of Northern Ireland 1965–1969
Members of the Senate of Northern Ireland 1961–1965
Lord Mayors of Belfast
Ulster Unionist Party members of the Senate of Northern Ireland